Jonas Faraasen Olsen (born 23 April 1988) is a Norwegian professional footballer who plays as a striker for Kvik Halden FK.

Career

He played for Berg IL as a youngster, but joined Kvik Halden FK as a teenager. He was drafted into the senior team ahead of the 2005 season. In the 2006 season he made his mark as a striker, scoring 20 goals. In 2007, he followed with 24 league goals. In 2008, he improved further, scoring 37 league goals. This also earned him Halden Arbeiderblad's Silver Ball award, for best footballer in the Halden region.

After the 2008 season he had a trial with Hamarkameratene. In July 2009 he joined Dutch side MVV. He scored his first league goal for MVV in August 2009, in the 1–1 draw against Cambuur Leeuwarden.

After returning to Kvik, he went on to IF Birkebeineren ahead of the 2013 season.

Personal life
He is a son of Jan Erik Olsen, a former goalkeeper for Kvik Halden.

References

External links
 Voetbal International

1988 births
Living people
Norwegian footballers
People from Halden
Kvik Halden FK players
MVV Maastricht players
Eerste Divisie players
Norwegian expatriate footballers
Expatriate footballers in the Netherlands
Norwegian expatriate sportspeople in the Netherlands
Association football forwards
Sportspeople from Viken (county)